Jong Yon-Hui (born 2 November 1989) is a North Korean synchronized swimmer. She competed in the women's duet at the 2012 Summer Olympics with Jang Hyang-Mi.

References 

1989 births
Living people
North Korean synchronized swimmers
Olympic synchronized swimmers of North Korea
North Korean female swimmers
Synchronized swimmers at the 2012 Summer Olympics
Asian Games medalists in artistic swimming
Artistic swimmers at the 2014 Asian Games
Medalists at the 2014 Asian Games
Asian Games bronze medalists for North Korea
21st-century North Korean women